Mohammed Haniff Hoosen is a South African politician who has served as a Member for the National Assembly for the Independent Democrats (ID) (2007–2014) and currently for the Democratic Alliance (DA) (2014–present). Within the Official Opposition Shadow Cabinet, he serves as the DA's spokesperson on the Standing Committee on the Auditor-General. He was the Shadow Minister of Cooperative Governance and Traditional Affairs from 2019 to 2020. Hoosen was also the Shadow Minister of Home Affairs from 2014 to 2019.

Biography
Hoosen was born in Chatsworth in the former Natal Province. He joined the National Party (NP), which became the New National Party (NNP). He was elected to the Durban city council in 1996 and served on the council until 2001.

Hoosen joined the Independent Democrats in 2005 and served as  head of the party's campaign in the 2006 municipal elections. He was soon elected Secretary-General of the ID in 2007. He joined the National Assembly in the same year. The ID joined the DA in 2010 and Hoosen was  given dual party membership. In 2012, Hoosen was elected as the Provincial Chairperson of the DA. He  became a DA MP in 2014 and was named the party's Shadow Minister of Home Affairs. He was re-elected as provincial chair in 2015.

Ahead of the 2016 municipal elections, Hoosen was selected as the DA's mayoral candidate for the eThekwini Metropolitan Municipality. The ANC retained control of the municipality and Hoosen remained an MP. Hoosen did not run for re-election as provincial chair in 2018.

In 2019, he became the Shadow Minister of Cooperative Governance and Traditional Affairs.

In December 2020, Hoosen was appointed as the DA's spokesperson on the Standing Committee on the Auditor-General.

Controversies

In 2011, Errol Walters, who served on the Democratic Alliance's electoral college, stated that the party was 'rife with nepotism and cronyism', alluding to the 'parachuting' of Hoosen's wife- Sharon Chetty. The then DA provincial leader Sizwe Mchunu stated: “It’s absolute, absolute lies.” Mchunu explained that: “This appears to be people who are aggrieved they didn’t make it… it’s sour grapes”.

In 2015- Hoosen who was at the time the then secretary-general of the Independent Democrats (ID) found out from the Sunday Star that one of the ID's parliamentary nominees, Narentuk Jumuna, was a convicted killer. Narentuk Jumuna, also served with Hoosen in the National Party. Jumuna, previously known as Shan Mohangi, was convicted of the murder of Hazel Mullen in Dublin, Ireland in 1962. Hoosen later stated 'that had the party been aware of the issue in the first place, Jumuna would not have been selected as a candidate.'  This is completely untrue as Shan Mohangi’s past was public knowledge and was consistently on the front page of all newspapers during previous election campaigns. Everyone in Sough African politics was aware of his past.

In 2016, Hoosen was nominated as the Democratic Alliance's mayoral candidate for eThekwini. The ANC provincial spokesman, Mdumiseni Ntuli, stated that Hoosen's 'apartheid past effectively disqualified him from running for the eThekwini mayoral position'. Hoosen was a full-time, paid organizer for the National Party during Apartheid- a fact that Hoosen confirmed during a multi-party debate on Radio Al-Ansaar.

References

External links
Mr Mohammed Haniff Hoosen – Parliament of South Africa
Mr Mohammed Haniff Hoosen – People's Assembly

Living people
Year of birth missing (living people)
Democratic Alliance (South Africa) politicians
Independent Democrats (South Africa) politicians
People from Durban
People from KwaZulu-Natal
South African politicians of Indian descent
Members of the National Assembly of South Africa